This is a list of Cornish sportsmen and sportswomen.

Football 
Ray Bowden (1909-1998), England international, former Plymouth Argyle, Arsenal and Newcastle United player
Harry Cann (1905-1980), former Plymouth Argyle player
 Ollie Chenoweth, retired professional football goalkeeper
Jack Cock (1893-1966), England international, former Chelsea, Everton and Plymouth Argyle player, first Cornishman to play for England
Alfred C. Crowle (1899-1979), manager of Mexico national football team
Matthew Etherington (born 1981), England U21 international, former Tottenham Hotspur, West Ham United and Stoke City player (played in two FA Cup finals with two different teams: West Ham United and Stoke City)
Johnny Hore (born 1947), former Plymouth Argyle player and manager
Tony Kellow (1952-2011), former Exeter City and Blackpool player, Vice-Chairman of the Cornwall Commonwealth Games Association (now defunct)
Nigel Martyn (born 1966), England international, former Crystal Palace, Leeds United and Everton player
Kevin Miller (born 1969), former Exeter City, Birmingham City, Watford and Crystal Palace player
Chris Morris (born 1963), Ireland international,  former Sheffield Wednesday, Celtic and Middlesbrough player
Wayne Quinn (born 1976), former Sheffield United, Newcastle United and West Ham United player
Charles Reep (1904-2002), inventor of the long ball
Jack Stephens (born 1994), England U21 international, Southampton player
Mike Tiddy (1929-2009), former Cardiff City, Arsenal and Brighton & Hove Albion player
Anthony Tonkin (born 1980), former Yeovil Town, Crewe Alexandra, Oxford United and Cambridge United player
Mike Trebilcock (born 1944), former Plymouth Argyle, Everton and Portsmouth player, FA Cup winner with Everton in 1966
Craig Weatherhill, historian, Cornish bard, goalkeeper for Cornwall

Cricket

Arthur Agar-Robartes, army officer and cricketer
Julian Cradick, Cornwall cricketer
Jack Crapp, England cricketer
Neil Edwards, First Class cricketer with Somerset CCC
Godfrey Furse
Carl Gazzard, First Class cricketer with Somerset CCC
Laura Harper, England international cricketer
Pasty Harris, First Class cricketer
Michael Munday (1995–2002), cricketer for Somerset CCC
Tony Penberthy, former First Class cricketer with Northamptonshire CCC
Jack Richards, England cricketer
Charlie Shreck (1991–1996), cricketer for Nottinghamshire CCC
Gary Thomas
Marcus Trescothick, England cricketer of Cornish lineage
Eric Willcock, English cricketer

See also Cornwall County Cricket Club List A players.

Rugby Union 
 Paul Andrew, rugby union player
 Olly Barkley, international and Premiership rugby player with Bath Rugby
 Luke Cowan-Dickie, international and Premiership rugby player with Exeter Chiefs 
 Ben Gollings, rugby player, of England Sevens, and Rugby Lions
 Francis Gregory, Cornish wrestler, boxer, rugby union footballer and rugby league footballer 
 Roger Hosen, international rugby player
 John Kendall-Carpenter, England international rugby union captain
 Josh Matavesi, Cornish-Fijian rugby player
 Sam Matavesi, Cornish-Fijian rugby player
 Richard Nancekivell, rugby player
 Jack Nowell (born 1993), international and Premiership rugby player with Exeter Chiefs
 Andy Reed, international rugby player who played for Bath RFC and won 18 caps for Scotland
 Vic Roberts, international rugby player
 Geoffrey Rowe, rugby player and comedian
 Richard Sharp, international rugby player of the 1960s who captained England and won 14 caps
 Barney Solomon, rugby union player who captained the silver medal winning Great Britain team in the 1908 Olympics
 Stack Stevens, international rugby and British Lions player who won 25 caps for England
 Rob Thirlby (1989–1992), England international rugby sevens player
 Phil Vickery, international rugby player and World Cup winner
 Tom Voyce, international and Premiership rugby player with London Wasps
 Hugh Vyvyan, international and Premiership rugby player
 Trevor Woodman, international rugby player and World Cup winner

See also Team members of the Cornwall team in the Summer Olympics, London, 1908.

Combat sports
 Jack Carkeek, Cornish American wrestler
 Gerry Cawley, champion Cornish wrestler
 Bob Fitzsimmons, boxer and first Heavyweight, Light-Heavyweight and Middleweight World Champion
 Francis Gregory, Cornish wrestler, boxer, rugby union footballer and rugby league footballer 
 Len Harvey, boxer
 Richard Parkyn, champion Cornish wrestler
 James Polkinghorne, champion Cornish wrestler
 Sweet Saraya (born 1971), pro wrestler
 See the following link for Notable Cornish wrestlers by country.

Watersports
Ben Ainslie (born 1977), sailor, 4-time Olympic gold medallist
Ed Coode (born 1975), rower, Olympic gold medalist
Ann Glanville (1796-1880), 19th-century champion rower
Helen Glover (born 1986), rower, 2-time Olympic gold medallist
Pete Goss (born 1961), sailor
Robert Peverell Hichens, (1909-1943), rower and motor-racing driver
Cassie Patten (born 1987), swimmer, Olympic bronze medallist
Hannah Stacey, free-diver 
Annabel Vernon (born 1982), rower, Olympic silver medallist

Others
Michael Adams (born 1971), chess grandmaster
 Richard Ashton, (born 1955) Athletics, 400 metres 
Jonah Barrington (born 1941), squash player
Jonathan Barron (born 1937), snooker player
Michaela Breeze (born 1979), weightlifter
Norman Croucher (born 1941), double amputee mountain climber
John George (born 1961), motor-racing driver
Paul Gosling (born 1949), darts player
James Honeybone (born 1991), fencer
Loveday King (born 1935), darts player
Brian Netherton (1942-2011), darts player
Nick Nieland (born 1972), athlete, javelin thrower
Robert Peverell Hichens, (1909-1943), rower and motor-racing driver
Jemma Simpson (born 1984), athlete, 800m runner
Peter Tregloan (born 1957), strongman and powerlifter
Talan Skeels-Piggins (born 1970), Paralympic alpine skier
Peter Tregloan (born 1957), strongman and powerlifter
Owen Truelove (1937-2006), record-holding glider pilot
Venetia Williams (born 1960), racehorse trainer and former jockey

See also

:Category:Sportspeople from Cornwall

References

Sportsmen and Women
 
Lists of English sportspeople